Udyan Sagar, better known by his stage name Nucleya, is an Indian electronic music producer.

Career 
In 1998 he co-founded Bandish Projekt with Mayur Narvekar and Mehirr Nath Choppra. In 2007, Udyan left Bandish Projekt after working with Mayur for about 12 years, and rebuilt himself as "Nucleya". After leaving Bandish Projekt his career struggled quite a bit initially. He drew inspiration from South Indian film music and Indian street music, and released his first EP "Koocha Monster" in 2013. In 2015, Nucleya launched his debut album, "Bass Rani", at a Ganpati visarjan on the streets of Mumbai. 2016 marked the release of "Raja Baja", and 2019 marked the release of "Tota Myna". In 2021, he released an EP titled "Baaraat" in collaboration with Ritviz. His songs have been popular in the independent music scene in India.

Nucleya, in collaboration with AIB, hosted and picked the winners of Bacardi House Party Sessions in 2017. He has also been a judge on the hip hop reality show MTV Hustle. He has performed at EDC Las Vegas and Mexico, the Bacardi NH7 Weekender, Sunburn Festival, Zomaland by Zomato, Vh1 Supersonic and YouTube Fanfest. He has opened for and performed with Skrillex, Major Lazer, DJ Snake and Krewella.

Personal life 
In 2008, he married his long-term girlfriend Smriti Choudhary. The couple currently live in Goa, with their son Guri, who was born in 2011. Guri has featured on some of Nucleya's tracks as "Guri Gangsta".

Discography

Albums and EPs

Singles and collaborations

Film music

Awards and nominations

Documentaries 

 Nucleya - Ride To The Roots. 2017 documentary, Red Bull Media House, 29 minutes.

References

External links 

 Nucleya on Spotify
 Nucleya on YouTube
 Nucleya on IMDb

Indian record producers
Living people
Indian electronic musicians
1979 births